Brajendra Kishore Roy Chowdhury (1874 AD - 1957 AD;  Bengali Year: 1281-1364 ) was a patron of Indian classical music and national education of the Indian national movement.

Background
He was the zamindar of Gouripur in Mymensingh, Bengal. His son was Pandit Birendra Kishore Roy Chaudhuri, the eminent sitar player, a founder of the music department of Rabindra Bharati University, Calcutta and author of Indian Music and Mia Tansen.

Work
He was one of the principal patrons of the National Council of Education that later became Jadavpur University, Calcutta. He was a member of the Floud Commission in 1939.

Writings
 Marxism and the Indian Ideal (1941)

See also
 Dawn (Bengali educational society)
 National Council of Education
 Jadavpur University

References

Indian male writers
Bengali writers
1874 births
1957 deaths